Acraephnes cryeropis is a moth in the family Depressariidae. It was described by Turner in 1947. It is found in Australia, where it has been recorded from New South Wales.

The wingspan is 22 mm. The forewings are shining white and the hindwings are white.

References

Moths described in 1947
Acraephnes
Taxa named by Alfred Jefferis Turner
Moths of Australia